Joseph Thomas Elliott (born 1 August 1959) is an English rock singer, best known as the lead singer and one of the founding members of the hard rock band Def Leppard. He has also been the lead singer of the David Bowie tribute band the Cybernauts and the Mott the Hoople cover band Down 'n' Outz. He is one of the two original members of Def Leppard still in the band and one of the three to perform on every Def Leppard album. Elliott is known for his distinctive and wide ranging raspy singing voice.

Early life and Def Leppard 
Joseph Thomas Elliott was born in Sheffield to Joseph William Elliott (1930–2011) and Cynthia Gibson. He was educated at King Edward VII School. Elliott met Pete Willis (a member of a local band called Atomic Mass) in November 1977 after missing a bus. Upon finding out that they were both musicians, Willis invited Elliott to meet the rest of the Atomic Mass members. The band spent hours talking and listening to records in Elliott's bedroom. Elliott tried out as a guitarist and, though the band had not heard Elliott sing, they were impressed by "his attitude and his ideas about being in a band" and he became the band's vocalist instead. The other members also took Elliott's suggestion to change their name to "Deaf Leopard." Elliott had invented the name for a band in his youth. Tony Kenning suggested they change the band name to "Def Leppard" to distinguish them from contemporary punk bands like The Flying Lizards and Boomtown Rats. The band claims that any apparent similarity of the name Led Zeppelin to Def Leppard was unintentional. Elliott soon became an integral part of the band while also contributing his songwriting skills.

As a songwriter, Elliott has drawn from his eclectic tastes in music (ranging from pop-rock to folk) as sources of inspiration. He has noted that the lyrics to Def Leppard's music are rarely personal; they are meant to be easily accessible to the listener. He also plays guitar and drums as well as piano and keyboard.

Elliott currently hosts a radio show on Planet Rock radio on Saturday nights.

Side projects 
Elliott has worked with several side projects through his career such as participating in numerous tributes to other artists like Freddie Mercury, Alice Cooper, Mick Ronson, Ian Hunter and David Bowie. He appeared alongside guitarists Brian May and Slash along with the other members of Def Leppard at the Freddie Mercury Tribute Concert in 1992 to perform "Tie Your Mother Down".

Elliott also has worked on several projects including guitarist Ronnie Wood's solo album Slide on This, Lori Spee's Those Faces, Ricky Warwick and The Almighty.

Elliott and fellow Def Leppard member Phil Collen once had a side project together called Cybernauts. The project was short-lived, and the internet album that was available online has been deleted since its 2001 release.

Released in September 2003 through Sanctuary Records, Ricky Warwick's Tattoos & Alibis was produced by Elliott.

Elliott sang the vocals in the Mott the Hoople cover band, Down 'n' Outz on their album My ReGeneration Vol. 1.

In 2012, Elliott went on tour with the Rock N Roll All Stars, a band that consisted of many of rock's most recognized performers. The band downsized and became the Kings of Chaos. The primary members with Elliott are Duff McKagan (Guns N' Roses, Velvet Revolver and Loaded), Matt Sorum (Guns N' Roses and Velvet Revolver), Gilby Clarke (Guns N' Roses), and Steve Stevens (Billy Idol's band). Others who rounded out the group were: Glenn Hughes (Deep Purple) and Sebastian Bach (formerly of Skid Row). The band released the cover song "Never Before" by Deep Purple.

Personal life 
Elliott currently lives in Stepaside, Dublin, Ireland and also has a residence in Los Angeles. He maintains a recording studio in his Dublin home called Joe's Garage in which he has recorded and produced many major artists. Other artists have also recorded there while he has been on the road with Def Leppard. Elliott is also a Sheffield United fan, having contributed music to the Sheffield-based film When Saturday Comes. 

Elliott's first marriage was to Karla Ramdhani in 1989; they divorced in 1996. Elliott met Kristine Wunschel in 2003 while she was working on the crew for the X album tour, and they were married on 1 September 2004.  Their first child, Finlay, was born in December 2009, and they are also parents to a daughter, Lyla, born July 2016. He announced on SiriusXM in March 2022 that he and his wife Kristine had another daughter named Harper who was born in February 2020.

Controversies 
During a performance on 7 September 1983 in Tucson, Arizona, Elliott attempted to rile the crowd during the "Rock of Ages" crowd sing-along. He told the crowd: "Last night, we played in El Paso, that place with all the greasy Mexicans, and they made a lot more noise than that." Then, on 30 September, he apologised on an El Paso radio station for the racial slur he made while referring to the city on 7 September. The band later followed up the apology with donations to Hispanic charities.

In 2008, Def Leppard performed live on stage at a Detroit Red Wings ice hockey game. Midway through the set, Red Wing forward Darren McCarty drove a motorcycle across the stage with the Stanley Cup on the back. Another Detroit player, Kyle Quincey, handed the cup to Elliott, who unintentionally placed the Cup upside-down on its stand. Upon realizing his error, Elliott quipped to the crowd, "Oh it's upside down. Well never mind. We're soccer boys, what do we know?" The incident angered many ice hockey fans. Elliott later said, "[E]very other sporting cup I've ever seen, was wider at the top than the base [...] Like most of my fellow Brits, I'd never seen it before until it was handed to me sideways by which time I had a 50/50 chance of getting it right." Coincidentally, Elliott had previously co-owned a Sheffield sports bar with Tim Cranston, a Canadian ice hockey player for the local Steelers.

In 2010, Elliott criticised the British music press, which he accused of ignoring his band and narrowing popular taste: 

Before a July 2019 show in Hamilton, Ontario, Elliott was recorded on video saying that the city's FirstOntario Centre "stinks like 10,000 asses". The video surfaced in January 2020.

Discography 

With Def Leppard

The Def Leppard E.P. (1979)
On Through the Night (1980)
High 'n' Dry (1981)
Pyromania (1983)
Hysteria (1987)
Adrenalize (1992)
Live: In the Clubs, in Your Face, recorded 1988 (1993)
Retro Active (1993)
Slang (1996)
Euphoria (1999)
X (2002)
Yeah! (2006)
Songs from the Sparkle Lounge (2008)
Mirrorball: Live And More (2011)
Viva! Hysteria (2013)
Def Leppard (2015)
The Story So Far – The Best Of (2018)
Diamond Star Halos (2022)

With Down 'n' Outz
My ReGeneration (2010)
The Further Adventures Of... (2014)
The Further Live Adventures Of... (2017)
This Is How We Roll (2019)

With Kings of Chaos
Re-Machined: A Tribute to Deep Purple's Machine Head – "Never Before" (2012)

With Cybernauts
Cybernauts Live

With various artists  
Beside Bowie: The Mick Ronson Story Vocals on All The Young Dudes and This Is For You

References

External links 

 Joe Elliott at DefLeppard.com
 Joe Elliott on Planet Rock

1959 births
Def Leppard members
English expatriates in Ireland
English heavy metal singers
English rock singers
English tenors
Living people
Musicians from Sheffield
People educated at King Edward VII School, Sheffield
Down 'n' Outz members
20th-century English male singers
20th-century English singers
21st-century English male singers
21st-century English singers